The Shah Mosque dates back to the 9th century Islamic calendar and is located in Mashhad, Khosravi Street.

Gallery

Sources 

Mosques in Iran
Mosque buildings with domes
National works of Iran